The 2016 Vaahteraliiga season was the 37th season of the highest level of American football in Finland. The regular season took place between May 13 and August 28, 2016. The Finnish champion was determined in the playoffs, and at the championship game Vaahteramalja XXXVII the Helsinki Roosters won their fifth consecutive championship, this time against the Seinäjoki Crocodiles.

Standings

Playoffs

References

American football in Finland
Vaahteraliiga
Vaahteraliiga